Mary Margaret Anderson CBE FRCOG (12 February 1932– 17 February 2006) was a Scottish gynaecologist.

Early life and education 
Mary Margaret Anderson was born on 12 February 1932, in Forres, Scotland. Her mother Lily, was a mathematics teacher and her father a pharmacist. She was educated at Forres Academy where she was the Dux. She studied medicine at the University of Edinburgh graduating in 1956. She moved to London to complete her medical education.

Career
After finishing her studies, she took the post of the first female obstetrics registrar appointed at St Mary's Hospital in London.

She served as Vice-President of the Royal College of Obstetricians and Gynaecologists from 1989 to 1992 and as a member of the Committee of the Future of Maternity Services, chaired by Baroness Cumberlege.

Before retirement, she worked as a Senior Obstetrician and Gynaecologist at University Hospital Lewisham.

Death and legacy
She died, aged 74, in Forres on 17 February 2006 from complications due to Parkinson's disease. She was interred in the family grave at Cluny Hill, Forres.

The Anderson Maternity Unit at Lewisham Hospital is named in her honour.

Awards and honours
She was made a Commander of the Order of the British Empire (CBE) in the 1996 Birthday Honours, "For services to Medicine".

References

External links 
 

1932 births
2006 deaths
Alumni of the University of Edinburgh Medical School
People from Forres
British gynaecologists
Women gynaecologists
20th-century British medical doctors
21st-century British medical doctors
Commanders of the Order of the British Empire
Scottish women medical doctors
20th-century women physicians
21st-century women physicians